Nancy Bélanger (born September 2, 1978)  is a Canadian curler from Charny, Quebec.  

Born in Sainte-Foy, Quebec, Bélanger plays third for Marie-France Larouche. As a member of Larouche's team, Bélanger won five straight junior provincial championships. In her last year of juniors in 1999, the team won the 1999 Canadian Junior Curling Championships followed by a bronze medal at the World Junior Curling Championships. In 2001, Bélanger won her first provincial women's championship with Larouche. She then left the team, only to come back for 2005-06 season. She left the team again in 2006-07 to play second for Brenda Nicholls. She came back for the 2007-08 season and won her second women's provincial championship in 2008.

External links
 

1978 births
Living people
Canada Cup (curling) participants
Canadian educators
Canadian women curlers
Curlers from Quebec
French Quebecers
People from Lévis, Quebec
People from Sainte-Foy, Quebec City
Sportspeople from Quebec City